Davinia Esther Anyakun (born 19 April 1976) is a Ugandan female politician and a procurement and logistics professional. She has been the woman Member of Parliament for Nakapiripirit District since 2016. She is a member of the National Resistance Movement, a political party led by Yoweri Museveni, the President of Uganda.

Background and education 
Anyakun was born on 19 April 1976 in Nakapiripirit District in Karamoja subregion. She started school in Nkoyoyo boarding primary and sat for her Primary Leaving Examinations in 1991. She later enrolled at Kangole Senior Secondary School and sat for her Uganda Certificate of Education exams in 1995. She sat her Uganda Advanced Certificate of Education exams in 1999 from Mbale secondary school. In 2002 she graduated with a diploma in social work and social administration from the Makerere Institute for Social Development. Esther Anyukan furthered her studies and in 2009 graduated with a diploma in health administration from Uganda Christian University and added a bachelor's degree in procurement and logistics from Nkumba University in 2009.

Early career 
Anyukan started her formal work from Amudat Hospital in 2004 as a senior hospital administrator which she did till 2010. In 2010 she joined the International Organization for Migration as a project officer. In 2013 started working with Agricultural Cooperative Development International/Volunteers in Overseas Cooperative Assistance and the United States Agency for International Development as a regional coordinator until 2015. In 2016 she was elected to the Parliament of Uganda for Nakapiripit District.

Political career 
Anyakun is the woman Member of Parliament for Nakapiripiriti District. She entered the Parliament of Uganda in May 2016 running on the National Resistance Movement party ticket. In Parliament, she serves on  served as a member of the Public Accounts Committee and the Committee on Foreign Affairs.

She is also a member of the Uganda Women Parliamentary Association (UWOPA).

Personal life 
Challa Elma Kapel, her daughter, became Miss Tourism Uganda in 2017.

References 

People from Nakapiripirit District
National Resistance Movement politicians
Women members of the Parliament of Uganda
Members of the Parliament of Uganda
1976 births
Living people
Uganda Christian University alumni
Nkumba University alumni
21st-century Ugandan women politicians
21st-century Ugandan politicians